Culex (Eumelanomyia) brevipalpis is a species of mosquito belonging to the genus Culex. It is found in India, Sri Lanka, Thailand, Bangladesh, Pakistan, Philippines, Singapore, Cambodia, Indochina, China, Taiwan, Ryukyu-Retto, New Guinea, Maluku, Indonesia, Malaysia, Myanmar, Japan, Vietnam and Bismarcks.

References

External links 
Redescription of four Oriental species of Culex
Culiciomyia Theobald, 1907 - Mosquito Taxonomic Inventory
Mosquito species associated within some Western Himalayas phytogeographic zones in the Garhwal region of India.

brevipalpis
Insects described in 1902